The 1976 Summer Olympics torch relay celebrated the first time that a Canadian city had hosted the Games. Convention states that the flame should be lit at Olympia in Greece and then transported to Athens, making its way onwards to the host city. On this occasion a signal was sent via satellite to transmit the flame to Ottawa where it would then make its way to the 1976 Summer Olympics opening ceremony in Montreal and a second ceremony in Kingston, Ontario.

Relay elements

Torch

The torch was primarily made of aluminium and weighed 836 grams. It was fuelled by olive oil in part to further strengthen the link to the Greek origins of the events.

Torch-bearers
There were around 1,214 torch-bearers who travelled a combined total of 775 km through Greece and Canada. For the section of the relay within Canada there were more than 4,000 applicants for just over 700 positions. Various criteria were enforced to ensure the quality of the runners, including the ability to run a kilometre in five minutes or less. For the first time a computer was used to select the torch-bearers based on these criteria. Unsuccessful candidates were encouraged to escort the torch-bearer during their run.

All torch-bearers were sent a copy of the "Flame Bearer's Guide" several months before they were due to participate which gave specific details about how they should carry the torch and how to transfer the flame.

Route
The Canadian Olympic Committee considered retracing the route taken by the country's discoverer, Jacques Cartier, but decided that this would be too similar to the 1968 Summer Olympics torch relay held in Mexico. They instead chose a route that would allow a significant number of athletes to participate at the same time while getting the flame from its home in Greece to the cauldron in Montreal in just five days.

The flame was lit in Olympia before progressing through several Greek cities, finishing the first leg of the journey in Athens. The distance between Athens and the final destination in Canada would normally have mandated transportation across the sea. However, the Canadian Olympic Committee had a more innovative solution. The Olympic flame was placed in front of a sensor that detects ionised particles and was then encoded into impulses and sent via satellite to Ottawa. The arrival of the signal activated a laser that recreated the Olympic flame in a 90 cm urn in the Canadian city.

Lighting of the cauldron
For the first time in the history of the torch relay two athletes lit the cauldron. The two final torch-bearers, Stéphane Préfontaine and Sandra Henderson, were 15 and 16 years old, respectively.

Continuation of the relay
Though the flame had reached the Olympic Stadium and was used to mark the opening of the Games the relay actually continued to a second venue. Many sailing and yachting events were going to be held in Kingston, Ontario and the flame was taken there using a variety of unusual transportation methods. The torches were carried to the city on horseback, bicycle, and canoes as well as the more traditional running relay.

Route

Route in Greece

Olympia
Krestena
Zacharo
Kyparissia
Filiatra
Gargalianoi
Nestoras
Pylos
Messene
Kalamata
Sparta
Tripoli
Nafplio
Argos
Corinth
Megara
Eleusis
Athens

Route in Canada

References

Torch Relay, 1976 Summer Olympics
Olympic torch relays